Esther Jackie Anderson (born 13 June 1979) is an Australian actress and model, known for her role as Charlie Buckton on the Australian soap opera Home and Away from 2008 until 2012. She was nominated for two Gold Logie Awards in 2010 and 2012. After leaving Home and Away, Anderson starred in the NBC television drama Siberia and was a contestant on The Celebrity Apprentice Australia.

Early life
Anderson was born on 13 June 1979 and she grew up in Geelong. Anderson is a model and she lived in Japan for six years, travelling between the country and Europe for work. She appeared in a number of television commercials in Japan, which led her to move to Melbourne to take acting courses, as she wanted to begin acting and presenting.

Career
In 2007, Anderson landed a presenting role on the Victorian version of Australian travel show Postcards. A year later, she secured an audition for television soap opera Home and Away and was cast as police constable Charlie Buckton. Producers introduced a lesbian plot for Charlie and Kate Bell's character Joey Collins to boost the shows ratings. It was Anderson's first big storyline and she was required to work more hours. The storyline was criticised by religious and conservative family groups, and Channel Seven later cut a kiss between the characters. Anderson earned four Logie Award nominations for her work on Home and Away, including two Gold Logie Awards. She quit Home and Away in 2011 and filmed her final scenes in August that year. She moved to Los Angeles for work in 2012.

Anderson stars in short film Breathless as Jodie, a woman in mourning over her deceased child. In August 2012, it was announced Anderson had landed a role in the NBC television drama Siberia, which was filmed in Canada. The series masquerades as a reality show, with the actors using their own names as they play a group of contestants who compete for a cash prize in the Siberian wilderness. Anderson reprised her role as Charlie Buckton in 2013 for "a handful of episodes".
 
In 2014, Anderson was cast in her first feature film Broken Contract by writer-director James Pentecost. She stars opposite Christopher Morris as Detective Keeling, an internal affairs cop. Broken Contract was filmed in Perth, Australia. The following year, Anderson was a contestant on the fourth season of The Celebrity Apprentice Australia. Anderson made a guest appearance in Netflix series GLOW, and appears in 2019 films Apple Seed and Madness in the Method. In 2021, she appeared in the Channel 9 series Amazing Grace.

Anderson made a guest appearance as Dr Sian Caton on the Australian television soap opera Neighbours in June 2022.

Personal life
Anderson was in a relationship with fellow Home and Away actor Conrad Coleby from 2008 until 2010, and with footballer Joel Selwood in 2012. She began dating advertising executive Howard Moggs in December 2014. They got engaged in February 2016, and married in Geelong in February 2017. In April 2018, Anderson announced she was expecting the couple's first child, and she gave birth to their son in August. In April 2022, Anderson confirmed she and Moggs were expecting their second child, and she gave birth to their second son on 28 September 2022.

Filmography

Awards and nominations

References

External links

Esther Anderson Ambassador For Tuffetts Women's Underwear

1979 births
Actresses from Victoria (Australia)
Australian soap opera actresses
Living people
The Apprentice Australia candidates
Actresses from Geelong
Actors from Geelong